Bella: An American Tall Tale is a stage musical with book, music, and lyrics by Kirsten Childs. The musical is set in the 1870s and tells a tale of the American frontier from the perspective of an African-American woman.

The musical originally premiered at Dallas Theatre Center on September 22, 2016, before its Off-Broadway premiere at Playwrights Horizons on May 19, 2017. The Off-Broadway production was co-presented by Playwrights Horizons and Dallas Theatre Center.

Development 

Kirsten Childs noticed that African Americans were not included in history books about the 1870s in the Wild West, and decided "to create a new myth celebrating the power and the beauty of the black female". 

The character of Nathaniel Beckworth, a train porter, is based on a real-life African American train porter named Nat Love. His last name "Beckworth" comes from James Beckwourth, who was an explorer, rancher, and fur trader. Tommie Haw is another real-life character that appears in Bella. Childs learned about his story while researching the Mai Wah Society in Butte, Montana, which works to document the history of Asian-Americans in the Rocky Mountains.

Synopsis 
Bella takes place in the 1870s in the Old West. Bella, a "Big Booty Tupelo Girl," sets off to Kansas to meet her fiancé, Aloysius T. Honeycutt, who is a Buffalo Soldier. Bella must make this journey under a false name in order to escape the law. Back home in Tupelo, Mississippi, Bella is in trouble for beating up Bonny Jonny. Her Mama, Grandma, and Aunt Dinah encourage her to leave the state so that she is not arrested. When Bella boards the train headed for Kansas, she attracts the attention of the passengers because of her large bottom. While on the train journey, Bella has fantasies about a gaucho and a Chinese cowboy. A porter on the train, Nathaniel Beckworth, falls in love with Bella.

Cast and Character 
 Ashley D. Kelley — Bella
 Marinda Anderson — Ida Lou/Aunt Dinah
 Yurel Echezarreta — Diego Moreno/CP Conyers
 Brandon Gill — Nathaniel Beckworth
 Olli Haaskivi — Gabriel Conyers/Scooter
 Josh Davis, Kevin Massey — Snaggletooth Hoskins/Bonny Jonny
 Jo’Nathan Michael — Mr. Dinwiddie/Scumbucket
 Kenita R. Miller — Miss Cabbagestalk/Mama
 Paolo Montalban — Tommie Haw/Skeeter
 Clifton Oliver — Aloysius T. Hunnicut
 Gabrielle Reyes — Mrs. Dinwiddie/Nurse
 NaTasha Yvette Williams — Grandma/Spirit of the Booty

Musical Numbers 

Act I
 "Big Booty Tupelo Gal" — Bella
 "The Language of My Nose and Lips and Hair" — Grandma, Aunt Dinah, Bella, Mama
 "Private Hunnicutt's Letter" — Aloysius
 "Quien Fuera Luna" — Diego Moreno, Miss Cabbagestalk, Bella
 "What I Want" — Bella, Nathaniel
 "Kansas Boun'" — Mama, Bella
 "Gal Over Younder" — Nathaniel, Bella
 "Tommie Haw" — Tommie Haw
 "Rollin' Along" — Bella, Nathaniel
 "Heaven Must Be Tupelo" — Bella
 "Bonny Johnny Rakehell" — Bonny Jonny, Bella
 "One Ass to Another" — Spirit of the Booty, Bonny Jonny, Bella

Act II
 "Bide a Little Time at the Circus" — Gabriel Conyers, Bella
 "White People Tonight" — Bella, CP Conyers
 "Trav'lin the World" — Bella, CP, Gabriel
 "Mama, Where Did You Go?" — Mama
 "Don't Start No S**t" — Aloysius
 "Nothin' But a Man" — Nathaniel
 "You Don't Know What Ya Got Until It's Gone" — Spirit of the Booty, Bella
 "Impossible" — Bella
 "Finale" — Bella, Company

References 

2016 musicals
African-American theatre
Off-Broadway musicals
Plays set in the 19th century
Plays set in Missouri
Works about the American Old West